Charlie's Group Limited is a New Zealand-based producer of beverage drinks.  It is owned by the Japanese beverage company Asahi.

Charlie's was founded in 1999 by Marc Ellis, Stefan Lepionka and Simon Neal.  Originally the company produced fresh orange juice; in 2001, Charlie's added other natural fruit juices.  They also sell loose fruit, fruit smoothies and sports water flavored with fruit juices.

In May 2008, Charlie's launched a line of fruit-based soft drinks. It marketed its products as "Honest", referring to the fact that the products are not from concentrate with no sugar added.

Charlie's listed on the NZX in 2006. In 2008, Charlie's opened a new plant in Renmark, South Australia.

In 2007, a Charlie's television commercial that featured children playing with fireworks was banned in New Zealand after the Television Commercials Approval Bureau received letters of complaint.  The commercial showed cartoon children allowing fireworks to explode between their teeth and shooting rockets at each other.  The Acting Fire Service National Commander Paul McGill said :"It's really disappointing that an advertiser will use this occasion to produce a commercial that glorifies behaviour that was unacceptable 20 years ago and is unacceptable today."  Ron Curteis, Charlie's Marketing Manager indicated that the commercial was not intended to condone such behavior and that they hadn't realized this sort of behavior was still a big issue.  Marc Ellis, director of Charlie's, later called for an overhaul of the advertising rules noting that the same panel who banned the commercial had initially certified that the commercial met all advertising standards.  The ban eventually became part of a larger discussion about the difference between content allowed in programming versus advertisement.

In July 2011, Japanese beverage company Asahi acquired Charlie's.

References

External links
 Charlies Group
 NZX overview

Beverage companies of New Zealand
Food and drink companies based in Auckland
Manufacturing companies based in Auckland
Asahi Breweries
Food and drink companies established in 1999
New Zealand drinks
New Zealand companies established in 1999